The Railroad Museum of the Niagara Frontier is located in the 1922-built Erie Railroad freight depot in North Tonawanda, New York. Operated by the Niagara Frontier Chapter of the National Railroad Historical Society, its mission is to preserve the railroad history of the Buffalo, New York area, once the railroad hub of America. The Museum is owned by the Niagara Frontier Chapter of the National Railway Historical Society.

History 
The museum was opened after members restored the depot on June 1, 2003. The ribbon cutting ceremonies included a speech from George Maziarz.

Exhibits 
The Railroad Museum of the Niagara Frontier owns several small artifacts and four pieces of railway equipment. They include two bay-window cabooses, one of Erie ancestry and the other from the New York Central. The Museum's locomotives include a gasoline-powered Plymouth 20-Tonner and a Whitcomb 50-Ton Diesel-Hydraulic centercab switcher built by the Canadian Locomotive Company in Kingston, Ontario. This locomotive was formerly owned by the Tonawanda Island Railroad (TILR).
Across the street from the station is an old New York Central interlocking tower called EL-2.  Future plans are to restore the tower and integrate it into the museum.

References

External links

References 

Museums in Niagara County, New York
Railroad museums in New York (state)
Museums established in 2003
2003 establishments in New York (state)